The death camas miner bee (Andrena astragali), is a species of miner bee in the family Andrenidae. Another common name for this species is death camas andrena. It is found in North America. It specialises in feeding on the highly poisonous Toxicoscordion venenosum and is possibly the only bee that can tolerate its toxins.

References

Further reading

External links

 

astragali
Articles created by Qbugbot
Insects described in 1914